The SBB Em 3/3 is a diesel shunting locomotive of the Swiss Federal Railways (SBB). They were built between 1959 and 1963, with a total of 41 units being manufactured by the Swiss Locomotive and Machine Works. They were designed to perform shunting duties for the SBB and were assigned running numbers 18801 to 18841.

Under the SBB they are classified as heavy shunters. Under SBBs later UIC classification system they were designated as being Em 830 class locomotives while being numbered 000 to 040.

See also
 List of stock used by Swiss Federal Railways

Notes

External links
 Photos

Em 3 3
C locomotives
Standard gauge locomotives of Switzerland
Railway locomotives introduced in 1959
Diesel-electric locomotives of Switzerland